Reciprocating motion, also called reciprocation, is a repetitive up-and-down or back-and-forth linear motion. It is found in a wide range of mechanisms, including reciprocating engines and pumps. The two opposite motions that comprise a single reciprocation cycle are called strokes.

A crank can be used to convert into reciprocating motion, or conversely turn reciprocating motion into circular motion.

For example, inside an internal combustion engine (a type of reciprocating engine),  the expansion of burning fuel in the cylinders periodically pushes the piston down, which, through the connecting rod, turns the crankshaft. The continuing rotation of the crankshaft drives the piston back up, ready for the next cycle. The piston moves in a reciprocating motion, which is converted into circular motion of the crankshaft, which ultimately propels the vehicle or does other useful work.

The reciprocating motion of a pump piston is close to, but different from, sinusoidal simple harmonic motion. Assuming the wheel is driven at a perfect constant rotational velocity, the point on the crankshaft which connects to the connecting rod rotates smoothly at a constant velocity in a circle. Thus, the displacement of that point, is indeed  exactly sinusoidal by definition.  However, during the cycle, the angle of the connecting rod changes continuously. So, the horizontal displacement of the "far" end of the connecting rod (i.e., connected to the piston) differs slightly from sinusoidal.  Circumstances where the wheel is not spinning with perfect constant rotational velocity, such as a steam locomotive starting up from a stop, are very much not sinusoidal. So basically a up and down a repetitive up-and-down or back-and-forth linear motion.

See also

References

Mechanical engineering